Karimganj South Assembly constituency is one of the 126 constituencies of the Legislative Assembly of Assam state in northeastern India.

Karimganj South (constituency number 4) is one of the 5 constituencies located in Karimganj district. Karimganj South is part of the Karimganj Lok Sabha constituency along with 7 other assembly segments, namely, Patharkandi, Karimganj North, Ratabari in Karimganj district, Hailakandi, Katlicherra and Algapur in Hailakandi district.

Members of Legislative Assembly 
 1957: Abdul Munim Choudhury, Indian National Congress
 1962: Abdul Munim Choudhury, Indian National Congress
 1967: P. Choudhury, Indian National Congress
 1972: Sudarsan Das, Indian National Congress
 1978: Abdul Muqtadir Choudhury, Indian National Congress
 1983: Abdul Muqtadir Choudhury, Indian National Congress
 1985: Abdul Muqtadir Choudhury, Indian National Congress
 1991: Pranab Kumar Nath, Bharatiya Janata Party
 1996: Abdul Muqtadir Choudhury, Indian National Congress
 2001: Siddeque Ahmed, Samata Party
 2006: Siddeque Ahmed, Indian National Congress
 2011: Siddeque Ahmed, Indian National Congress
 2016: Aziz Ahmed Khan, All India United Democratic Front
 2021: Siddeque Ahmed, Indian National Congress

Election results

2016 result

External links

References

Assembly constituencies of Assam